Cristian Rosso (born 29 January 1984 in Mar del Plata, Argentina) is an Argentine rower. He competed in the double sculls at the 2012 Summer Olympics where he finished 4th together with Ariel Suárez. Cristian has won two gold medals at the 2011 Pan American Games, two medals at the 2015 Pan American Games (silver and bronze) and a silver medal at the 2007 Pan American Games.

References 
 

1984 births
Living people
Argentine male rowers
Sportspeople from Mar del Plata
Pan American Games gold medalists for Argentina
Pan American Games bronze medalists for Argentina
Rowers at the 2012 Summer Olympics
Olympic rowers of Argentina
Rowers at the 2011 Pan American Games
Rowers at the 2015 Pan American Games
Pan American Games silver medalists for Argentina
Pan American Games medalists in rowing
South American Games gold medalists for Argentina
South American Games medalists in rowing
Competitors at the 2010 South American Games
Medalists at the 2011 Pan American Games
Medalists at the 2015 Pan American Games